Strażnik Światła is the tenth studio album by the Polish heavy metal band Turbo. It was released in 2009 in Poland through Metal Mind Productions. The album was recorded in 2009. This is the band's first album with the new singer, Tomasz Struszczyk, and also the first concept album by Turbo.

Track listing

Personnel

References

2009 albums
Turbo (Polish band) albums
Metal Mind Productions albums
Polish-language albums